Many of the existing freeways in Southern California's Inland Empire were completed in the late 1970s. The only exception is the segment of the Foothill Freeway, State Route 210 (SR 210) between San Dimas and San Bernardino, completed in July 2007.
In general, most of the higher paying jobs are located in Los Angeles and Orange County. Thus, workers must commute daily up to two hours in each direction on the existing network. As the population increases, traffic congestion is also projected to increase. In 2007, Forbes magazine ranked the area first in its list of America's most unhealthy commutes, beating every other major metropolitan area in the country, as Inland area drivers breathe the unhealthiest air and have the highest rate of fatal auto accidents per capita.

Freeway system

The Inland Empire is crossed by two interstates and several major state highways. Although major freeway construction was finished years ago (except for the recent completion of SR 210 from Fontana to San Bernardino), growth in the region has strained the freeway system. As a result, several major projects have recently been completed or are underway on freeways throughout the region. Examples include the 60/215/91 interchange and widening of I-10 through Redlands as well as the currently ongoing widening of I-215 through Downtown San Bernardino into the city's University District. 

 State Route 2
 San Bernardino Freeway (Interstate 10)
 Mojave Freeway/Barstow Freeway/Ontario Freeway/Corona Freeway/Temecula Valley Freeway/Escondido Freeway (Interstate 15)
 State Route 18
 State Route 38
 Needles Freeway (Interstate 40)
 State Route 58
 Pomona Freeway/Moreno Valley Freeway (State Route 60)
 State Route 62
 State Route 66
 Corona Expressway/Chino Valley Freeway (State Route 71)
 State Route 74
 State Route 78
 State Route 79
 State Route 83
 State Route 86
 Riverside Freeway (State Route 91)
 U.S. Route 95
 State Route 111
 State Route 127
 State Route 138
 State Route 142
 State Route 173
 State Route 177
 State Route 178
 State Route 189
 Foothill Freeway (State Route 210)
 Barstow Freeway/San Bernardino Freeway/Riverside Freeway/Moreno Valley Freeway/Escondido Freeway (Interstate 215)
 State Route 243
 State Route 247
 State Route 259
 State Route 330
 State Route 371
 U.S. Route 395
 County Route R2
 County Route R3

Public transportation

 Metrolink commuter rail provides service to points throughout the Greater Los Angeles Area, San Diego and the rest of Southern California.
 San Bernardino Express, a brt system that is currently the only rapid transit system in the Inland Empire. Serves San Bernardino and Loma Linda.
 Morongo Basin Transit Authority provides bus service to and from Morongo Basin communities, Palm Springs, Yucca Valley and Twentynine Palms.
 Omnitrans is the largest public transportation provider in San Bernardino County.
 Riverside Transit Agency is the largest public transportation provider in Riverside County.

Airports
Three major airports serve the Inland Empire: Ontario, Palm Springs, and San Bernardino. However, there are many general aviation airports across the region.

References

External links
 IE 511 (Inland Empire 511) – a transportation related information project sponsored by the Riverside County Transportation Commission and San Bernardino Associated Governments

 
Inland Empire
Public transportation in Southern California